Port Stephens is an electoral district of the Legislative Assembly in the Australian state of New South Wales. It is represented by Kate Washington of the Labor Party.

Port Stephens includes most of the Port Stephens LGA (excluding  and ), and parts of southern Mid-Coast Council (including Hawks Nest and Tea Gardens).

History
Port Stephens was created in 1988, partly replacing Gloucester.

Members for Port Stephens

Election results

References

Port Stephens
Port Stephens
1988 establishments in Australia
Port Stephens Council
Politics of Newcastle, New South Wales